Wayne Clarke may refer to:

 Wayne Clarke (footballer) (born 1961), former professional football player from England
 Wayne Clarke (broadcaster) (born 1961),  radio presenter and producer

See also
 Wayne Clark (disambiguation)